The DSW Tag Team Championship was the tag team championship in Deep South Wrestling, a former developmental territory of World Wrestling Entertainment between 2005 and 2007. The title was last held by Caleb Konley and Sal Rinauro, who defeated Pretty Boy Floyd and Simon Sermon on July 26, 2007. The championships have yet to be revived upon DSW's reopening in February 2021.

Title history

References

Tag team wrestling championships
Regional professional wrestling championships